The plantar tarsometatarsal ligaments consist of longitudinal and oblique bands, disposed with less regularity than the dorsal ligaments.

Those for the first and second metatarsals are the strongest; the second and third metatarsals are joined by oblique bands to the first cuneiform; the fourth and fifth metatarsals are connected by a few fibers to the cuboid.

References 

Ligaments of the lower limb